Ibrahima Sory Doumbouya (born 25 March 1996) is a Guinean professional footballer who plays as a defender for Guinée Championnat National club Horoya AC and the Guinea national team.

References

External links 

 

 

1996 births
Living people

Guinean footballers
Association football defenders
Wakriya AC players
Horoya AC players
Guinée Championnat National players
Guinea international footballers
Guinea A' international footballers
2020 African Nations Championship players